The Little Oak Formation is a geologic formation in Alabama. It preserves fossils dating back to the Ordovician period.

See also

 List of fossiliferous stratigraphic units in Alabama
 Paleontology in Alabama

References
 

Geologic formations of Alabama
Ordovician Alabama
Ordovician southern paleotemperate deposits